Nedime Elif Ağca Yarar (born February 10, 1984 in Ankara), also known as Nedime Elif Ağca Öner, is a retired national level Turkish volleyball player who last played for Fenerbahçe. She studied at Marmara University.

Career
Since the 2012/2013 season, she plays for the Turkish club Fenerbahçe. She played with this club in the 2012 FIVB Club World Championship and won the bronze medal and the Best Setter award after defeating Puerto Rico's Lancheras de Cataño 3-0.

Clubs
  VakıfBank Güneş Sigorta (2001-2007)
  RC Cannes (2007-2008)
  VakıfBank Güneş Sigorta (2008-2009)
  Galatasaray (2009-2010)
  Eczacıbaşı VitrA (2010-2012)
  Fenerbahçe (2012-2014)

Awards

Individuals
 2012 FIVB Women's Club World Championship "Best Setter"

Clubs
 2004 Turkish League -  Champion, with VakıfBank Güneş Sigorta
 2004 CEV Top Teams Cup -   Champion, with VakıfBank Güneş Sigorta
 2005 Turkish League -  Champion, with VakıfBank Güneş Sigorta
 2007-08 French Cup -  Champion, with RC Cannes
 2007-08 French League -   Champion, with RC Cannes
 2011 Turkish Cup -  Champion, with Eczacıbaşı VitrA
 2012 Turkish League -  Champion, with Eczacıbaşı VitrA
 2012 FIVB Women's Club World Championship –  Bronze Medal, with Fenerbahçe
 2012-13 CEV Cup -  Runner-Up, with Fenerbahçe
 2013-14 CEV Cup -  Champion, with Fenerbahçe
 2015 Turkish Cup -  Champion, with Fenerbahçe
 2014–15 Turkish Women's Volleyball League -  Champion, with Fenerbahçe Grundig

National team
 2005 Mediterranean Games -  Gold Medal

See also
 Turkish women in sports

References

 http://www.galatasaray.org/haber/voleybol/bayan-voleybol/elif-agca-galatasarayda/19853

External links
 Nedime Elif Agca Öner (2008) at the International Volleyball Federation
 Nedime Elif Agca Öner (2010) at the International Volleyball Federation
 Nedime Elif Agca Oner at WorldofVolley
 
 Nedime Elif Öner (Nedime Elif Ağca Yarar) at Volleybox.net
 

1984 births
Living people
Sportspeople from Ankara
Turkish women's volleyball players
VakıfBank S.K. volleyballers
Galatasaray S.K. (women's volleyball) players
Fenerbahçe volleyballers
Turkish expatriate volleyball players
Turkish expatriate sportspeople in France
Marmara University alumni
Mediterranean Games gold medalists for Turkey
Mediterranean Games medalists in volleyball
Competitors at the 2005 Mediterranean Games